South Turton is an unparished area of the Metropolitan Borough of Bolton, in Greater Manchester, England. Historically the southern part of Turton, and within the Historic County of Lancashire, it lies on the southern slopes of the West Pennine Moors, and has a population of 25,067.

South Turton was created in 1974 from the smaller urban area of the former Turton Urban District. This unparished area includes Bradshaw, Bromley Cross, Harwood, Dunscar, Eagley, and Egerton.

Electoral wards
South Turton has two electoral wards – Bromley Cross and Bradshaw.  Each ward has three councillors who represent the area on Bolton Metropolitan Borough Council.

Education
Primary schools
St Maxentius C.of E. Primary School, New Heys Way, Bradshaw
Eagley Infant School, Stonesteads Drive, Bromley Cross
Eagley Junior School, Chapeltown Road, Bromley Cross
St John the Evangelist R.C. School, Darwen Road, Bromley Cross
Egerton Community Primary School, Cox Green Road, Egerton
Walmsley C.of E. Primary School, Blackburn Road, Egerton
Christ's Church C.of E. Primary School, Stitch-mi-Lane, Harwood
Hardy Mill Primary School, Belmont View, Harwood
Harwood Meadows Primary School, Orchard Gardens, Harwood
St Brendan's R.C. Primary School, Brookfold Lane, Harwood

Secondary schools
Canon Slade School, Bradshaw Brow, Bradshaw
Turton School and Sixth Form, Bromley Cross Road, Bromley Cross

See also

Listed buildings in South Turton

References

External links
South Turton Area Update
South Turton – Photos and information

Unparished areas in Greater Manchester
Geography of the Metropolitan Borough of Bolton
West Pennine Moors
Areas of Greater Manchester